is a railway station in the city of Gujō, Gifu Prefecture, Japan, operated by the third sector railway operator Nagaragawa Railway.

Lines

Station layout
Mino-Shirotori Station has a two opposed ground-level side platforms connected to the station building by a level crossing. The station is staffed.

Adjacent stations

|-
!colspan=5|Nagaragawa Railway

History
Mino-Shirotori Station was opened on July 5, 1933. Operations were transferred from the Japan National Railway (JNR) to the Nagaragawa Railway on December 11, 1986. The station was renamed to its present name on October 1, 1996.

Surrounding area
former Shirotori Town Hall

Bus routes
Shirotori Kotsu
For Itoshiro
For Hirugano Ski Place
For Gujo-Hachiman Station

See also
 List of Railway Stations in Japan

References

External links

 

Railway stations in Japan opened in 1933
Railway stations in Gifu Prefecture
Stations of Nagaragawa Railway
Gujō, Gifu